Char kway teow (sometimes also spelled as char kuey teow) is a stir-fried rice noodle dish from Maritime Southeast Asia of southern Chinese origin. In Hokkien and Teochew, char means 'stir-fried' and kway teow refers to flat rice noodles. It is made from flat rice noodles or kway teow of approximately 1 cm or about 0.5 cm in width, stir-fried over very high heat with garlic, light and dark soy sauce, chilli paste, whole prawns, shelled blood cockles, chopped Chinese chives, slices of Chinese sausage, and bean sprouts. Other common ingredients include fishcake and belachan. 

Originally developed and catered to overseas-born Chinese labourers in the Southeast Asia region, the dish has achieved widespread popularity within the region from the late 20th century onwards, particularly in Malaysia and Singapore. On the other hand, the dish has also acquired a reputation of being unhealthy within modern contexts due to its high saturated fat content, as it is traditionally stir-fried in pork fat with crisp croutons of pork lard.

History and etymology

The dish was often sold by fishermen, farmers and cockle-gatherers who doubled as char kway teow hawkers in the evening to supplement their income. The high fat content and low cost of the dish made it attractive to these people as it was a cheap source of energy and nutrients. 

The term "char kway teow" is a transliteration of the Chinese characters 炒粿條 (in simplified Chinese 炒粿条). The dish's name is Hokkien (chhá-kóe-tiâu?), but the dish may have its roots in Chaozhou in China's Guangdong province and is mostly associated with the Teochew. The word kóe-tiâu (literally meaning "ricecake strips") generally refers to flat rice noodles, which are the usual ingredient in Singapore and West Malaysia. There is no fixed way of spelling chhá-kóe-tiâu, and many variants can be found: examples include "char kueh teow", "char kuey teow", "char koay teow", "char kueh tiao", "char kuay tiaw", "char kueh tiaw" and so on. 

In March 2021, Dewan Bahasa and Pustaka (DBP), Malaysia's authority on standardised Malay, formally declared that the proper spelling of flat rice noodles in Malaysian Malay is kuetiau. Conversely, kuetiau is rarely used in Singapore, with kway teow being used instead.

Owing to the dish's popularity and spread to Cantonese-speaking areas, the term "char kway teow" has been corrupted into "炒貴刁" when presented in the aforementioned areas. The term "" has no real meaning, but its pronunciation in Cantonese and Mandarin is similar to "粿條" in Min Nan.

Variations
"Gourmet" versions of char kway teow, where the dish may be prepared with more seafood, with crab meat and with duck eggs, may be found in major Malaysian cities like Ipoh and Penang. In Penang, char kway teow is commonly served on a piece of banana leaf on a plate, which is intended to enhance the aroma of the dish.

In Singapore, char kway teow is a popular, inexpensive dish usually eaten for breakfast and sold at food stalls in Singapore. Blood cockles and prawns are standard fare in typical hawker preparations, while more expensive or luxurious versions incorporate cuttlefish, squid, and lobster meat. Singaporean style char kway teow mixes yellow wheat noodles with flat rice noodles. Some cooks prepare more health-conscious versions with extra vegetables and less oil. 

Char kway teow prepared by Muslims in Malaysia and Singapore exclude lard and pork products, and may incorporate alternative ingredients like beef or chicken. Some versions by Malay cooks may emphasise the use of kerang (Malay for cockles) as a key ingredient, and it may be prepared with or without gravy. 

Many Southeast Asian restaurants in Hong Kong offer char kway teow as an overseas specialty, although it is of Southeast Asian Chinese origin. The char kway teow offered in Chinese restaurants which serve Hong Kong-style Cantonese cuisine is an entirely different dish: stir-fried Chinese-style flat rice noodles with prawns, char siu, onions, and bean sprouts, seasoned with curry powder which renders it bright yellow in colour. In some places this is known as Fried "Good Dale", a transliteration of the characters "炒貴刁".

See also
 Beef chow fun
 Chinese noodles
 Mee goreng
 Mie goreng
 Pad thai
 Pad see ew
 Kuai tiao

References

External links

Fried noodles
Hong Kong noodle dishes
Malaysian noodle dishes
Singaporean noodle dishes